The Palacio de Eventos de Venezuela is a convention center in Maracaibo, Venezuela. Its infrastructure is constituted by 6 levels that offer wide possibilities for its multifunctional use to any kind of events; and is 0.3 km away from the centre of the Maracaibo. The 7,000-seat center is the largest convention center in Maracaibo, and hosted the Miss Venezuela 2010 pageant.

References

Indoor arenas in Venezuela
Buildings and structures in Maracaibo
Convention centers in Venezuela